Apostolidi is a rural locality (a khutor) in Takhtamukayskoye Rural Settlement of Takhtamukaysky District, the Republic of Adygea, Russia. The population was 93 as of 2018. There are 3 streets.

Geography 
The khutor is located 7 km southwest of Takhtamukay (the district's administrative centre) by road. Supovsky is the nearest rural locality.

Ethnicity 
The khutor is inhabited by Russians and Ukrainians.

References 

Rural localities in Takhtamukaysky District